A conformal loop ensemble (CLEκ) is a random collection of non-crossing loops in a simply connected, open subset of the plane. These random collections of loops are indexed by a parameter κ, which may be any real number between 8/3 and 8. CLEκ is a loop version of the Schramm-Loewner evolution: SLEκ is designed to model a single discrete random interface, while CLEκ models a full collection of interfaces.

In many instances for which there is a conjectured or proved relationship between a discrete model and SLEκ, there is also a conjectured or proved relationship with CLEκ. For example:

CLE3 is the limit of interfaces for the critical Ising model.
CLE4 may be viewed as the 0-set of the Gaussian free field.
CLE16/3 is a scaling limit of cluster interfaces in critical FK Ising percolation.
CLE6 is a scaling limit of critical percolation on the triangular lattice.

Constructions

For 8/3 < κ < 8, CLEκ may be constructed using a branching variation of an SLEκ process.  When 8/3 < κ ≤ 4, CLEκ may be alternatively constructed as the collection of outer boundaries of Brownian loop soup clusters.

Properties

CLEκ is conformally invariant, which means that if  is a conformal map, then the law of a CLE in D''' is the same as the law of the image of all the CLE loops in D under the map .

Since CLEκ may be defined using an SLEκ process, CLE loops inherit many path properties from SLE. For example, each CLEκ loop is a fractal with almost-sure Hausdorff dimension 1+κ/8. Each loop is almost surely simple (no self intersections) when 8/3 < κ ≤ 4 and almost surely self-touching when 4 < κ < 8.

The set of all points not surrounded by any loop, which is called the gasket, has Hausdorff dimension 1 + 2/κ + 3κ/32 almost surely (Random soups, carpets and fractal dimensions by Nacu and Werner. Since this dimension is strictly greater than 1+κ/8, there are almost surely points not contained in or surrounded by any loop. However, since the gasket dimension is strictly less than 2, almost all points (with respect to area measure) are contained in the interior of a loop.

CLE is sometimes defined to include only the outermost loops, so that the collection of loops is non-nested (no loop is contained in another). Such a CLE is called a simple CLE to distinguish it from a full or nested'' CLE. The law of a full CLE can be recovered from the law of a simple CLE as follows. Sample a collection of simple CLE loops, and inside each loop sample another collection of simple CLE loops. Infinitely many iterations of this procedure gives a full CLE.

References 

Lattice models